Victor Gee Keung Wong (July 30, 1927 – September 12, 2001) was an American actor, artist, and journalist of Chinese descent. 

He appeared in supporting roles in films throughout the 1980s and 1990s, including Chinese sorcerer Egg Shen in John Carpenter's cult film Big Trouble in Little China, royal adviser Chen Bao Shen in the Best Picture–winning The Last Emperor (1987), rural storekeeper Walter Chang in the comedy horror film Tremors (1990), and Grandpa Mori in the 3 Ninjas tetralogy (1992-98). He also played several starring roles for independent filmmaker Wayne Wang, who described him as his "alter-ego".

Earlier in his career, Wong worked for KQED as an on-air reporter and later a pioneering photojournalist. His association with Mark Rothko, whom he met during his studies at the San Francisco Art Institute, saw him interact with several luminaries of the Beat Generation, including Jack Kerouac, who fictionalized him as "Arthur Ma" in his novel Big Sur.

Early life and education
Wong was born in San Francisco and lived in Chinatown near the Stockton Street Tunnel to Chinese parents. His father, Sare King Wong, was born and raised in Guangdong province, and later moved to Shanghai as a news journalist. His mother Alice was a devout Christian who took the family to the First Chinese Baptist Church every week. Wong was one of five children; his siblings were Sarah Wong Lum, Zeppelin Wong, and twins Shirley Wong Frentzel and Betty Wong Brown. Sare King Wong's grandfather had founded the  Young China newspaper with Dr. Sun Yat-sen. Victor Wong was fluent with both English and Cantonese, which helped lead his acting career to Hong Kong.

Wong and his family moved to Courtland, California when he was two years old after his father took a job as teacher and principal at a school for the children of local Chinese laborers. The family would move back to Chinatown within three years and his father was active in local politics. He would live in Sacramento, California for much of his adult life.

Wong studied political science and journalism at the University of California, Berkeley and theology at the University of Chicago under Paul Tillich, Reinhold Niebuhr and Martin Buber. In Chicago, Wong joined The Second City comedy troupe and stayed with Langston Hughes. Wong returned to San Francisco for the summer, taking part in a theatre production and never returning to Chicago; he resumed his studies at the San Francisco Art Institute under Mark Rothko, earning a master's degree in 1962.

Journalism
Although he had acted in and staged productions with his first wife, Olive, who he had met after his return from Chicago, Wong was inspired by the assassination of John F. Kennedy to pursue a career in journalism, landing an on-air role for KQED's Newsroom, where he won a Regional Emmy, from 1968 until 1974, when he was stricken with Bell's palsy. 

During his tenure on Newsroom, Wong is credited with inventing the photojournalistic essay, covering stories with his still camera and returning to narrate them in the studio. The palsy would give him his later distinctive appearance, but at the time, he felt his roles had diminished because he wasn't "pretty looking".

Acting career 
After his news career ended, Wong turned to acting, starting in the local Asian American theatre and later landing larger roles on the stages of New York City. In October 1980, Wong made his Asian American Theater Company (AATC) debut in San Francisco by appearing in their production of Paper Angels by Genny Lim. He was on Social Security Disability Insurance at the time due to his palsy. In New York, he acted in the plays Family Devotions and Sound and Beauty, written by David Henry Hwang.

His stage work led to television work and eventually, into movies; his film debut was in 1984's Dim Sum: A Little Bit of Heart, directed by Wayne Wang. In between film roles, Wong lived in Sacramento, California, where he supported the local performing arts. In 1992, he acted in the Hong Kong film, Cageman (笼民). He later starred as Grandpa Mori in the 3 Ninjas franchise, and the cult-classics, Big Trouble in Little China and Tremors. Director Bernardo Bertolucci had trouble with Wong on the set of The Last Emperor amid arguments over historical authenticity and cut most of Wong's scenes in the film, which won the Best Picture Oscar for 1987.

He worked closely with director Wayne Wang. The independent filmmaker and fellow San Franciscan first cast him in the lead role of his 1985 film Dim Sum: A Little Bit of Heart, and went on to include him in Eat a Bowl of Tea and Life Is Cheap... But Toilet Paper Is Expensive (both 1989), and The Joy Luck Club (1993). Wang later called Wong his role model for living life.

He retired from acting in 1998 after suffering two strokes. Wong returned to art, and held a solo exhibition at the B. Sakata Garo gallery in Sacramento.

Association with the Beat Generation

In the 1950s, while studying art under Mark Rothko, Victor Wong had his first art exhibition at the City Lights Bookstore. During this time, Wong befriended Lawrence Ferlinghetti. He illustrated Oranges, Dick McBride's first collection of poetry, which was handset and printed at the Bread and Wine Mission in 1960. He met Jack Kerouac in the early 1960s, who chronicled their meeting in his novel Big Sur (1962). In the novel, Wong is characterised as "Arthur Ma".

Personal life
Wong was married four times: to Olive Thurman Wong (daughter of civil rights activist Howard Thurman), Carol Freeland, Robin Goodfellow, and Dawn Rose. He had two daughters, Emily and Heather, and three sons, Anton, Lyon, and Duncan. His children Emily and Anton were from his first marriage to Olive Thurman. 

His son, musician Lyon Wong, died in 1986 after being attacked by a young man while walking home in Sacramento. Wong was asked to film the prologue scene for Big Trouble in Little China shortly after Lyon's wake; after shooting the scene, Wong suffered his first stroke. At approximately the same time, Wong met and befriended Dawn Rose, who was an artist in Locke; they married in 1998 and together they purchased a former restaurant and store completed in 1913 in Walnut Grove, planning to open an art gallery and teahouse there in 2001.

Death
On September 11, 2001, Wong and his wife Dawn Rose spent the day trying to get news of Wong's sons, who lived in New York City (they were unharmed). After she went to sleep, Wong stayed up to continue following the news; he died of myocardial infarction at some point during the early hours of September 12, 2001. He was 74.

Filmography

Film

Television

References

External links
 
Asian Week obituary

Sare Ging Wong in the 1940 Census

1927 births
2001 deaths
American male film actors
American male journalists
American male television actors
American journalists of Chinese descent
American television journalists
Beat Generation people
Male actors from San Francisco
University of Chicago Divinity School alumni
University of California, Berkeley alumni
American male actors of Chinese descent
20th-century American male actors
20th-century American journalists
American expatriates in Hong Kong
San Francisco Art Institute alumni